Moskau may refer to:
The German name for Moscow
"Moskau", a song by Dschinghis Khan from their self-titled album
"Moskau", a song by Rammstein from the album Reise, Reise
Reichskommissariat Moskau, a proposed civilian Nazi occupation regime

See also
Moscow (disambiguation)
Moskovsky (disambiguation)
Moskva (disambiguation)